Elias Barela is an American attorney and politician who served as a member of the New Mexico House of Representatives for the 8th district from 2009 to 2011.

Background 
Barela earned a Juris Doctor from the University of New Mexico School of Law. He has worked as a lawyer at several law firms, before founding his own law firm. He was elected to the New Mexico House of Representatives in January 2009 and assumed office in 2010. He was defeated for re-election in the 2010 Democratic primary. Barela later served on the 13th Judicial District Court Nominating Commission.

References 

Living people
Democratic Party members of the New Mexico House of Representatives
University of New Mexico School of Law alumni
New Mexico lawyers
Year of birth missing (living people)